Odontopleuridae is a family of odontopleurid trilobites found in marine strata throughout the world.  Odontopleurids of Odontopleuridae first appear in Late Cambrian-aged marine strata, and the last genera perish by the end of the Frasnian stage during the Late Devonian.  The members of Odontopleuridae are famous for their spinose appearance, having long, often numerous spines along the edges of their exoskeletons, and derived from ends of segments or tubercle ornaments.

Genera
Genera include

Acanthalomina
?Acidaspidella
?Acidaspides
Acidaspis
Anacaenaspis
Apianurus
Archaeopleura
Boedaspis
Borkopleura
Brutonaspis
Calipernurus
Ceratocara
Ceratocephala
Ceratocephalinus
Ceratonurus
Chlustinia
Dalaspis
Diacanthaspis
Dicranurus
Dudleyaspis
Edgecombeaspis
Eoleonaspis
Exallaspis
Gaotania
Globulaspis
Hispaniaspis
Isoprusia
Ivanopleura
Kettneraspis
Koneprusia
Laethoprusia
Leonaspis
Meadowtownella
Miraspis
Ningnanaspis
Odontopleura
Orphanaspis
Periallaspis
Primaspis
Proceratocephala
Radiaspis
Rinconaspis
Selenopeltis
Selenopeltoides
Sinespinaspis
Stelckaspis
Taemasaspis
Uriarra
Whittingtonia

References

Odontopleurida
Trilobite families
Furongian first appearances
Frasnian extinctions